Ibrahima Faye (born 22 October 1979) is a Senegalese former professional footballer who played as a defender.

Career
Faye and was born in Pout, a small village near the city of Thiès in Senegal. Moving to France to pursue his footballing career, he completed his youth development at Gazélec Ajaccio before joining Red Star Saint-Ouen.

After a season in Ligue 2 and a season in Championnat National with Red Star he left to join Belgian top-flight club K.A.A. Gent where he spent three seasons as a first-team regular.

Faye moved back to France in 2004 with Stade Malherbe Caen. He played 30 league games as Caen suffered relegation to Ligue 2. Shortly into the following season, he joined Troyes, becoming a fixture in the team.

In August 2009 Faye trialled with Stoke City of the English Premiership. In October 2009, he also had a trial with Ipswich Town. After making a good impression playing for the club's reserves he was in negotiations for a contract.

In August 2012, Faye joined RE Bertrix of the Belgian third tier.

Post-playing career
In 2017, Faye became manager at French lower-league side OFC Charleville.

External links

References

1979 births
Living people
Sportspeople from Thiès
Senegalese footballers
Senegalese expatriate footballers
Senegal international footballers
2004 African Cup of Nations players
2008 Africa Cup of Nations players
Association football defenders
Red Star F.C. players
K.A.A. Gent players
Stade Malherbe Caen players
ES Troyes AC players
UJA Maccabi Paris Métropole players
Paris FC players
Ligue 1 players
Belgian Pro League players
Senegalese football managers
OFC Charleville managers
Expatriate footballers in Belgium
Expatriate footballers in Turkey
Expatriate footballers in Northern Cyprus
Ibrahima